Non-wage labour costs are social security and insurance contributions, labour taxes and other costs related to employing someone and may include:

statutory and contractual (non-statutory) contributions covering social insurance, including retirement, healthcare, unemployment, child allowance, maternity, disability and other contingencies;
taxes on payrolls or credits that are not directly linked to social programmes;
cost of providing non-statutory services to employees such as additional days off work, company day-care, transportation or company cantine.

See also
National Insurance (United Kingdom)
Social Security contributions in France
Social Security funding in Germany
Social security contributions in Spain

External links
Definition of Non-wage labour costs (OECD)

Costs
Social security
Withholding taxes